Candy (released internationally as Candy: A Death in Texas) is an American biographical crime drama streaming television miniseries created by Nick Antosca and Robin Veith. The series stars Jessica Biel as the real-life Candy Montgomery, who was accused of the axe murder of her neighbor, Betty Gore (played by Melanie Lynskey) in 1980, in Texas. It premiered on May 9, 2022, on Hulu, with a new episode for five nights until May 13.

Premise
In Wylie, Texas, in 1980 suburban housewife Candy Montgomery is accused of murdering her neighbor Betty Gore, after having an affair with Gore's husband Allan.

Cast

Main
Jessica Biel as Candy Montgomery 
Melanie Lynskey as Betty Gore 
Pablo Schreiber as Allan Gore 
Timothy Simons as Pat Montgomery 
Raúl Esparza as Don Crowder

Recurring
Jessie Mueller as Sherry Cleckler 
Adam Bartley as Richard 
Justin Timberlake as Deputy Steve Deffibaugh 
Jason Ritter as Deputy Denny Reese

Episodes

Production

Development
In July 2020, it was announced UCP was developing a series revolving around Candy Montgomery, with Robin Veith writing the pilot for the series, and Nick Antosca set to executive produce under his Eat the Cat banner, with no network attached. In December 2020, it was announced Hulu had landed the series. In October 2021, it was announced Elisabeth Moss, who was originally set to star as Candy, had to drop out due to scheduling conflicts and would be replaced by Jessica Biel.

Filming
Principal photography began in December 2021 and continued through February 2022, and took place in Austell, Georgia.

Release
Candy premiered on the streaming service Hulu in the United States on May 9, 2022, with new episodes airing for five subsequent nights until May 13. Hulu majority-owner Disney has also confirmed that Candy will be coming to its Disney+ Hotstar service in India on July 15.

Candy was released on Disney+ in Canada, Australia and New Zealand on July 27 and for Singapore on August 10 and in the UK and Ireland on October 12 as a Star Original. On Latin America, the series debuted on July 27, 2022, on Star+.

Internationally, the show's main title is Candy: A Death In Texas despite the thumbnail on Disney+ simply listing it as Candy.

Reception

Audience viewership 
According to Whip Media's viewership tracking app TV Time, Candy was the 5th most anticipated new television series of May 2022. According to the streaming aggregator JustWatch, Candy was the most streamed television series across all platforms in the U.S., during the week of May 9, 2022 to May 15, 2022. According to the streaming aggregator Reelgood, Candy was the 8th most streamed television series across all platforms, during the week of May 14, 2022, and the 3rd during the week of May 21, 2022. Media play news

Critical response 
On review aggregator website Rotten Tomatoes, the limited series holds a 71% approval rating based on 34 critic reviews, with an average rating of 6.4/10. The website's critics consensus reads, "Candys sour aftertaste is counterbalanced by uniformly terrific performances, but it only takes a couple licks before this true crime drama loses its flavor." On Metacritic, the series has a score of 64 out of 100, based on 10 critics, indicating "generally favorable reviews".

Josh Bell of CBR.com stated that the series manages to provide a late 1970s aesthetic through its decor and costumes, complimented how the miniseries succeeds to depict the struggles of the main characters through its dark tone, and praised Biel's performance as Candy Montgomery, while complimenting the rest of the supporting actors. Brian Lowry of CNN found that Candy manages to be more effective than most true crime drama series, stating that Biel and Lynskey's performances are convincing and well-rendered, while complimenting how the miniseries manages to provide solid additional scripted elements compared to other contemporary series of the same genre.

Joel Keller of Decider praised the performances of the cast, especially Biel and Lynskey's, and found interesting the choice to start the miniseries with Betty Gore's death, followed by the reconstitution of what has occurred between the characters in the later episodes. Matt Fowler of IGN rated the miniseries 7 out of 10 and complimented the performances of the cast members, while praising how the show manages to keep an atmosphere of tension without providing too much information during its first episodes. Maggie Boccella of Collider gave the miniseries a C+ rating and claimed that the show manages to be a satisfactory true crime drama, while praising the performances of the actors, but criticized the lack of development of the characters.

Accolades

See also
 Love & Death (2023), another television miniseries based on the same case

References

External links
 
 

2020s American crime drama television series
2020s American drama television miniseries
2022 American television series debuts
2022 American television series endings
Adultery in television
American biographical series
Collin County, Texas
English-language television shows
Hulu original programming
Serial drama television series
Television series by 20th Century Fox Television
Television series by Universal Content Productions
Television series set in 1980
Television shows about murder
Television shows filmed in Georgia (U.S. state)
Television shows set in Texas